Henry Clement Doolittle (July 15, 1850 – August 8, 1926) was a member of the Wisconsin State Assembly.

Biography
Doolittle was born on July 15, 1850 in Princeton, Illinois. He moved to Wisconsin in 1887, settling in Cumberland, Wisconsin. He died in Boise, Idaho.

Career
Doolittle was elected to the Assembly in 1902. Previously, he had served as an alderman, Justice of the Peace, and Supervisor of Cumberland. He was a Republican.

References

External links

The Political Graveyard

People from Princeton, Illinois
People from Cumberland, Wisconsin
Wisconsin city council members
County supervisors in Wisconsin
Wisconsin state court judges
Republican Party members of the Wisconsin State Assembly
1850 births
1926 deaths
Burials in Idaho